Omar Al-Shammaa (born 1946) is a Lebanese film and voice actor.

Filmography

Film
Princess of Rome .2015
Asfouri - Abu Abed. 2012

Television 
Izz ad-Din al-Qassam - Yusuf. 1999
Arabic Language Club. 1998
Laugh and Cry. 1997
The Miserables. 1974
The River. 1974

Plays

Dubbing roles 
 1001 Nights - Majid (second voice)
 Alice in Wonderland - Mad Hatter (Classical Arabic version)
 Atlantis: Milo's Return - Preston B. Whitmore (Classical Arabic version)
 Atlantis: The Lost Empire - Preston B. Whitmore (Classical Arabic version)
Bolt (2008 film) - Dr. Forrester (Classical Arabic version)
 Ratatouille - Horst (Classical Arabic version)
 Robin Hood - Nutsy (Classical Arabic version)
 Arabian Nights: Sinbad's Adventures – Blue Demon
 Treasure Planet - Billy Bones (Classical Arabic version)
 Up (2009 film) - Carl Fredricksen (Classical Arabic version)

References

External links 
 

1946 births
Living people
Lebanese male actors
Lebanese male voice actors
Lebanese male television actors
20th-century Lebanese male actors
21st-century Lebanese male actors